Won Young-jun (born 8 January 1998) is a South Korean swimmer. He competed in the men's 100 metre backstroke event at the 2016 Summer Olympics.

References

External links
 

1998 births
Living people
South Korean male backstroke swimmers
Olympic swimmers of South Korea
Swimmers at the 2016 Summer Olympics
Place of birth missing (living people)
Universiade medalists in swimming
Universiade bronze medalists for South Korea
Medalists at the 2017 Summer Universiade
21st-century South Korean people